The team eventing in equestrian at the 2018 Asian Games was held at the Jakarta International Equestrian Park from 24 to 26 August 2018.

The Japanese team of Yoshiaki Oiwa, Ryuzo Kitajima, Takayuki Yumira and Kenta Hiranaga won the gold medal. India won the silver medal and Thailand took bronze.

The team and individual eventing competitions used the same scores.  Eventing consisted of a dressage test, a cross-country test, and a jumping test. The jumping test had two rounds, with only the first used for the team competition. Team eventing final scores were the sum of the three best overall individual scores (adding the three components) from the four-pair teams.

Schedule
All times are Western Indonesia Time (UTC+07:00)

Results
Legend
EL — Eliminated
WD — Withdrawn

References

External links
Dressage results
Cross-country results
Jumping results

Team eventing